Thomas Wolf (born 28 January 1963) is a retired Luxembourgian football defender. He played for the Luxembourgish national team .

References

1963 births
Living people
Luxembourgian footballers
FC Avenir Beggen players
Union Luxembourg players
CS Grevenmacher players
Association football defenders
Luxembourg international footballers